The legislative speaker of Lebanon is the highest office in the legislative body of Lebanon.

The current legislative body is the Parliament of Lebanon, headed by the Speaker of the Parliament of Lebanon, officially called the President of the Chamber of Deputies of the Lebanese Republic.

The speaker and his deputy are elected by the majority of deputies vote. By convention, the speaker shall always be a Shia Muslim.

The current speaker is Nabih Berri, serving since 1992.

List of speakers

See also 
President of Lebanon
Prime Minister of Lebanon

References 

Legislative speakers of Lebanon